Capua is a city and comune in the province of Caserta, in the region of Campania, southern Italy, situated  north of Naples, on the northeastern edge of the Campanian plain.

History

Ancient era
The name of Capua comes from the Etruscan Capeva. The meaning is 'City of Marshes'. Its foundation is attributed by Cato the Elder to the Etruscans, and the date given as about 260 years before it was "taken" by Rome. If this is true it refers not to its capture in the Second Punic War (211 BC) but to its submission to Rome in 338 BC, placing the date of foundation at about 600 BC, while Etruscan power was at its highest. In the area several settlements of the Villanovian civilization were present in prehistoric times, and these were probably enlarged by the Oscans and subsequently by the Etruscans.

Etruscan supremacy in Campania came to an end with the Samnite invasion in the latter half of the 5th century BC.

About 424 BC it was captured by the Samnites and in 343 BC besought Roman help against its conquerors. Capua entered into alliance with Rome for protection against the Samnite mountain tribes, along with its dependent communities Casilinum, Calatia, Atella, so that the greater part of Campania now fell under Roman supremacy.

In the second Samnite War with Rome, Capua proved an untrustworthy Roman ally, so that after the defeat of the Samnites, the Ager Falernus on the right bank of the Volturnus was confiscated. In 318 BC the powers of the native officials (meddices) were limited by the appointment of officials with the title praefecti Capuam Cumas (taking their name from the most important towns of Campania); these were at first mere deputies of the praetor urbanus, but after 123 BC were elected Roman magistrates, four in number; they governed the whole of Campania until the time of Augustus, when they were abolished. It was the capital of Campania Felix.

In 312 BC, Capua was connected with Rome by the construction of the Via Appia, the most important of the military highways of Italy. The gate by which it left the Servian walls of Rome bore the name Porta Capena; perhaps the only case in which a gate in this line of fortifications bears the name of the place to which it led. At some time the Via Latina was extended to Casilinum. It afforded a route only  longer, and the difficulties with its construction were much less; it also avoided the troublesome journey through the Pontine Marshes.

The importance of Capua increased steadily during the 3rd century BC, and at the beginning of the Second Punic War it was considered to be only slightly behind Rome and Carthage themselves, and was able to furnish 30,000 infantry and 4,000 cavalry. Until after the defeat of Cannae it remained faithful to Rome, but, after an unsuccessful demand that one of the consuls should always be selected from it (or perhaps in order to secure regional supremacy in the event of a Carthaginian victory), it defected to Hannibal. He made it his winter quarters, and he and his army were voluntarily received by Capua. Livy and others have suggested that the luxurious conditions were Hannibal's "Cannae" because his troops became soft and demoralized by luxurious living. Historians from Reginald Bosworth Smith onwards have been skeptical of this, observing that his troops gave as good an account of themselves in battle after that winter as before. After a long siege, Capua was taken by the Romans in 211 BC and severely punished in the Second Battle of Capua; its magistrates and communal organization were abolished, the inhabitants who weren't killed lost their civic rights, and its territory was declared  (Roman state domain). Parts of it were sold in 205 BC and 199 BC, another part was divided among the citizens of the new colonies of Volturnum and Liternum, established near the coast in 194 BC, but the greater portion of it was reserved to be let by the state.

Considerable difficulties occurred in preventing illegal encroachments by private persons, and it became necessary to buy a number of them out in 162 BC. It was, after that period, let, not to large but to small proprietors. Frequent attempts were made by the democratic leaders to divide the land among new settlers. M. Junius Brutus the Elder in 83 BC actually succeeded in establishing a colony, but it was soon dissolved; and Cicero's speeches De Lege Agrania were directed against a similar attempt by Servilius Rullus in 63 BC.

In the meantime the necessary organization of the inhabitants of this thickly populated district was in a measure supplied by grouping them round important shrines, especially that of Diana Tifatina, in connection with which a pagus Dianae existed, as we learn from many inscriptions; a pagus Herculaneus is also known.

It enjoyed great prosperity, however, due to their growing of spelt, a grain that was put into groats, wine, roses, spices, unguents etc., and also owing to its manufacture, especially of bronze objects, of which both the elder Cato and the elder Pliny speak in the highest terms.

Its luxury remained proverbial, and Campania was especially spoken of as the home of gladiatorial combat. From the gladiatorial schools of Campania came Spartacus and his followers in 73 BC. Julius Caesar as consul in 59 BC succeeded in carrying out the establishment of a Roman colony under the name Julia Felix in connection with his agrarian law, and 20,000 Roman citizens were settled in this territory.

The number of colonists was increased by Mark Antony, Augustus (who constructed an aqueduct from the Mons Tifata and gave the town of Capua estates in the district of Knossos in Crete valued at 12 million sesterces) and Nero.

In the war of 69 AD Capua took the side of Vitellius. Under the later empire it is not often mentioned, but in the 4th century it was the seat of the consularis Campaniae and its chief town, though Ausonius put it behind Mediolanum (Milan) and Aquileia in his ordo nobilium urbium.

Middle Ages

Under Constantine, a Christian church was founded in Capua. In 456, it was taken and destroyed by the Vandals under Gaiseric, but was likely soon rebuilt.

During the Gothic War, Capua suffered greatly. When the Lombards invaded Italy in the second half of the 6th century, Capua was ravaged; later, it was included in the Duchy of Benevento, and ruled by an official styled gastald.

In 839, the prince of Benevento, Sicard, was assassinated by Radelchis I of Benevento, who took over the throne. Sicard's brother Siconulf was proclaimed independent prince in Salerno and the gastald of Capua declared himself independent.

In 840, ancient Capua was burned to the ground by a band of Saracen mercenaries called by Radelchis I of Benevento with only the church of Santa Maria Maggiore (founded about 497) remaining (which was purposely spared by the invading Muslims, whose policy was that to leave houses of worship alone). A new city was built in 856, but at some distance from the former site, where another town later appeared under the name of Santa Maria Capua Vetere ("Capua the Old").

Prince Atenulf I conquered Benevento in 900 and united the principalities until 981, when Pandulf Ironhead separated them in his will for his children. Capua eclipsed Benevento thereafter and became the chief rival of Salerno. Under Pandulf IV, the principality brought in the aid of the Normans and, for a while had the loyalty of Rainulf Drengot, until the latter abandoned him to aid the deposed Sergius IV of Naples take back his city, annexed by Pandulf in 1027.

Upon Pandulf's death, Capua fell to his weaker sons and, in 1058, the city itself fell in a siege to Rainulf's nephew Richard I, who took the title Prince of Aversa. For seven years (1091–1098), Richard II was exiled from his city, but with the aid of his relatives, he retook the city after a siege in 1098. His dynasty lived on as princes of Capua until the last claimant of their line died in 1156 and the principality was definitively united to the kingdom of Sicily. In the 1230s, King Frederick I built the monumental City Gate of Capua.

In the early 1500s, it was reported to Pope Alexander VI that his son, Cesare Borgia, had captured the city and promptly killed all 6,000 citizens, which included women and children, while commanding French troops during the sieges of Naples and Capua.

Modern Age
On 3 January 1799, during the French Revolutionary Wars, this community was successfully attacked by a French-controlled 1798–1799 Roman Republic Army led by Governor MacDonald.
 
The Battle of Volturnus (1860), at the conclusion of Garibaldi's Expedition of the Thousand, partially took place in and around Capua. Prior to the battle, the Neapolitan army, defeated in earlier engagements, was rebuilt in Capua under marshal Giosuè Ritucci. After fighting elsewhere in which the Neapolitans were ultimately defeated, the last of them—around 3,000 troops under Colonel Perrone—were holed up in Capua. The city was attacked by the Garibaldines and one Piedmontese regular Bersaglieri battalion, and captured. In the referendum several months later, its inhabitants voted overwhelmingly to join the new Kingdom of Italy.

Main sights 
 The cathedral of Santo Stefano, erected in 856, has a lofty campanile, and a renovated interior with three aisles; both it and the atrium have ancient granite columns. The Romanesque crypt, with ancient columns, has also been restored. It has a fine paschal candlestick, and the fragments of a pulpit with marble mosaic of the 13th century. The mosaics of the beginning of the 12th century in the apses of the cathedral and of San Benedetto, were destroyed about 1720 and 1620 respectively.
 The small church of San Marcello was also built in 856. In 1232–1240 the emperor Frederick II erected a castle to guard the Roman bridge over the Volturnus, composed of a triumphal arch with two towers. This was demolished in 1557. The statues with which it was decorated were contemporary imitations of classical sculptures. Some of them were preserved in the Museo Campano.
 The  (the Campania Provincial Museum of Capua) was founded in 1870 and opened to the public in 1874.  Since then it has become a cultural reference point for the whole territory and Campania.

Archaeological sites

Remains
No pre-Roman remains have been found within the town of Capua itself, but important cemeteries have been discovered on all sides of it, the earliest of which go back to the 7th or 6th century BC.

The tombs are of various forms, partly chambers with frescoes on the walls, partly cubical blocks of peperino, hollowed out, with grooved lids. The objects found within them consist mainly of vases of bronze (many of them without feet, and with incised designs of Etruscan style) and of clay, some of Greek, some of local manufacture, and of paintings. On the east of the town, in the Patturelli property, a temple has been discovered with Oscan votive inscriptions originally thought to be Oscan, now recognized as Etruscan, some of them inscribed upon terracotta tablets, the most famous of which is the Tabula Capuana, conserved in Berlin, still, after more than a century of searching, the second-longest Etruscan text. Other brief inscriptions are on cippi. A group of 150 tuff statuettes represent a matron holding one or more children in her lap: three bore Latin inscriptions of the early Imperial period.

The site of the town being in a perfectly flat plain, without natural defences, it was possible to lay it out regularly.

The west gate was the Porta Romana; remains of the east gate (the name of which we do not know) have been found. This fact shows that the main street of the town was perfectly oriented, and that before the Via Appia was constructed, i.e. in all probability in pre-Roman times. The width of the town from north to south cannot be so accurately determined as the line of the north and south walls is not known, though it can be approximately fixed by the absence of tombs. Beloch fixes it at 4,000 Oscan feet = , nor is it absolutely certain (though it is in the highest degree probable, for Cicero praises its regular arrangement and fine streets) that the plan of the town was rectangular.

Within the town are remains of public baths on the north of the Via Appia and of a theatre opposite, on the south. The former consisted of a large cryptoporticus round three sides of a court, the south side being open to the road; it now lies under the prisons. Beloch (see below) attributes this to the Oscan period; but the construction as shown in Labruzzi's drawing (v. 17) 1 is partly of brick-work and opus reticulatum, which may, of course, belong to a restoration. The stage of the theatre had its back to the road; Labruzzi (v. 18) gives an interesting view of the cavea. It appears from inscriptions that it was erected after the time of Augustus.

Other inscriptions, however, prove the existence of a theatre as early as 94 BC. The Roman colony was divided into regions and possessed a capitolium, with a temple of Jupiter, within the town, and the marketplace, for unguents especially, was called Seplasia; we also hear of an aedes alba, probably the original senate house, which stood in an open space known as albana. But the sites of all these are uncertain. A Mithraeum may also be seen, by appointment.

Amphitheatre

Outside the town, in Santa Maria Capua Vetere, there is the amphitheatre, built in the time of Augustus, restored by Hadrian and dedicated by Antoninus Pius, as the inscription over the main entrance recorded. The exterior was formed by 80 Doric arcades of four stories each, but only two arches now remain. The keystones were adorned with heads of divinities.

The interior is better preserved; beneath the arena are subterranean passages like those in the amphitheatre at Puteoli.

To the east are considerable remains of baths – a large octagonal building, an apse against which the church of Santa Maria delle Grazie is built, and several heaps of debris. On the Via Appia, to the south-east of the east gate of the town, arc two large and well-preserved tombs of the Roman period, known as le Carceri vecchie and la Conocchia.

To the east of the amphitheatre an ancient road, the Via Dianae, leads north to the Pagus Dianae, on the west slopes of the Mons Tifata, a community which sprang up around the famous and ancient temple of Diana, and probably received an independent organization after the abolition of that of Capua in 211 BC. The place often served as a base for attacks on the latter, and Sulla, after his defeat of Gaius Norbanus, gave the whole of the mountain to the temple.

Within the territory of the pagus were several other temples with their magistri. After the restoration of the community of Capua, we find magistri of the temple of Diana still existing, but they were probably officials of Capua itself.

The site is occupied by the Benedictine church of San Michele Arcangelo in Sant'Angelo in Formis. It dates from 944, and was reconstructed by the abbot Desiderius (afterwards Pope Victor III) of Monte Cassino. It has interesting paintings, dating from the end of the 11th century to the middle of the 12th, in which five different styles may be distinguished. They form a complete representation of all the chief episodes of the New Testament. Deposits of votive objects (favissae), removed from the ancient temple from time to time as new ones came in and occupied all the available space, have been found, and considerable remains of buildings belonging to the Vicus Dianae (among them a triumphal arch and some baths, also a hail with frescoes, representing the goddess herself ready for the chase) still exist.

The ancient road from Capua went on beyond the Vicus Dianae to the Volturnus (remains of the bridge still exist) and then turned east along the river valley to Caiatia and Telesia. Other roads ran to Puteoli and Cumae (the so-called Via Campana) and to Neapolis, and as we have seen the Via Appia passed through Capua, which was thus the most important road centre of Campania.

See also
 History of Santa Maria Capua Vetere
 Archdiocese of Capua
 Battle of Capua
 Capua Leg
 Seconda Università degli Studi di Napoli
 Siege of Capua (211 BC)

References

Sources
 
 
 

 
856 establishments
Cities and towns in Campania
Roman sites of Campania
9th-century establishments in Italy